Pyrausta pseudonythesalis, the Shasta pyrausta moth, is a moth in the family Crambidae. It was described by Eugene G. Munroe in 1976. It is found in North America, where it has been recorded from California, Nevada, Arizona, New Mexico and Texas.

References

Moths described in 1976
pseudonythesalis
Moths of North America